Mrs. Salkım's Diamonds is a 1999 Turkish drama film, directed by Tomris Giritlioğlu. It is based on the historical novel Mrs. Salkim's Diamonds by Yılmaz Karakoyunlu. The film, which went on nationwide general release across Turkey on 19 November 1999, won awards at film festivals in Antalya and Istanbul, including the Golden Orange Award for Best Film. This film was submitted to Turkey's 72nd Academy Awards for the Academy Award for Best Foreign Language Film, but was not accepted as a nominee.

Novel
The novel Mrs. Salkım's Diamonds (Salkım Hanımın Taneleri), written by Turkish author and ANAP party member Yilmaz Karakoyunlu in 1990, recounts stories and witnesses of the non-Muslims during the Varlik Vergisi. The novel was developed into a film in 1999.

Film
The film is set during the period of the Varlik Vergisi where many non-Muslims were forced to pay higher taxes, often in an arbitrary and unrealistic way. Around two thousand non-Muslims, who could not pay the amount demanded for the tax within the time-limit of thirty days, were arrested and sent to a forced labor camp in Aşkale in the Erzurum Province of eastern Turkey. Twenty-one of these laborers died there.

The movie language is in Turkish, however some scenes include Armenian. The film follows the plight of one family and traces how they were affected by the tax and other policies directed at non-Muslim ethnic minorities. The plot has a young Armenian man named Levon who is sent to Askale along with a man who considered himself ethnic Turkish, only to find out that there was Jewish ancestry in his bloodline (donme). Nora, an Armenian woman who was raped, kills herself and her baby because she did not want to bear a child of an involuntary pregnancy.

Production
The film was shot on location in Aşkale, Büyükada and Mardin.

Cast
Hülya Avşar as Nora
Kamran Usluer as Halit Bey
Zuhal Olcay as Nefise
Uğur Polat as Levon
Derya Alabora as Nimet
Güven Kıraç as Bekir
Zafer Algöz as Durmuş
Murat Daltaban as Clarinetist Artin

Awards

Antalya Golden Orange Film Festival
Best Picture (Golden Orange): Tomris Giritlioğlu
Best Actor: Uğur Polat
Best Music: Tamer Çıray
Best Art Direction: Ziya Ulkenciler 
Best Film Editing: Mevlüt Kocak

Istanbul International Film Festival
Best Actor: Güven Kıraç

Reactions
Ahmet Çakar, a member of Parliament from the MHP, was outraged at the screening and believed it is indecent and unacceptable under the guidance of nationalism.

See also
List of Turkish submissions for the Academy Award for Best Foreign Language Film

References

External links
 

1999 drama films
Turkish drama films
Films set in 1942
Films set in Istanbul
Films shot in Turkey
Golden Orange Award for Best Film winners
Films based on Turkish novels
1999 films
1990s Turkish-language films